George Armitage (born 1942) is an American film director.

George Armitage may also refer to:
George Armitage (footballer) (1898–1936)

See also

George Armytage (disambiguation)
Armitage (surname)